In quantum information and computation, the Solovay–Kitaev theorem says, roughly, that if a set of single-qubit quantum gates generates a dense subset of SU(2), then that set can be used to approximate any desired quantum gate with a relatively short sequence of gates. This theorem is considered one of the most significant results in the field of quantum computation and was first announced by Robert M. Solovay in 1995 and independently proven by Alexei Kitaev in 1997. Michael Nielsen and Christopher M. Dawson have noted its importance in the field.

A consequence of this theorem is that a quantum circuit of  constant-qubit gates can be approximated to  error (in operator norm) by a quantum circuit of  gates from a desired finite universal gate set. By comparison, just knowing that a gate set is universal only implies that constant-qubit gates can be approximated by a finite circuit from the gate set, with no bound on its length. So, the Solovay–Kitaev theorem shows that this approximation can be made surprisingly efficient, thereby justifying that quantum computers need only implement a finite number of gates to gain the full power of quantum computation.

Statement 
Let  be a finite set of elements in SU(2) containing its own inverses (so  implies ) and such that the group  they generate is dense in  SU(2). That is,  approximates  to operator norm error.

Quantitative bounds 
The constant  can be made to be  for any fixed . However, there exist particular gate sets for which we can take , which makes the length of the gate sequence tight up to a constant factor.

Proof idea 
Suppose we have an approximation  such that .

The key idea is that commutators of elements close to the identity can be approximated "better-than-expected".

where the big O notation hides higher-order terms. One can naively bound the above expression to be , but the group commutator structure creates substantial error cancellation.

We use this observation by rewriting the expression we wish to approximate as a group commutator . We can get a base case approximation with constant  by brute-force computation of all sufficiently long gate sequences.

References 

Mathematical theorems
Quantum computing
Quantum information theory